The Russian Women's Volleyball Supercup is a volleyball competition between the champion of Russia and the winner of the Cup of Russia . The first edition of the Russian Women's Volleyball Supercup was held in the 2017 season

List of champions

Winners by club

References

External links
 Всероссийская федерация волейбола